In the Looking Glass is a surreal television series, broadcast on BBC2 in 1978. It starred John Wells, John Fortune, Carl Davis, and Madeline Smith, was directed by Andrew Gosling and produced by Ian Keill. The same team had previously created 1974's The End of the Pier Show. Wells, Fortune and Davis appear to have been the main writers for both series.

In the Looking Glass was notable for its design, overlaying live action and drawn or animated backgrounds, for instance, a hole drilled to the centre of the earth, or the Monopoly board on which a character risks being crushed by rolling dice. The production team (Keill, Gosling and designer Graham McCallum) went on to develop this approach further in the "live action comic strip" series Jane (1982), for which McCallum won two BAFTA Best Graphics awards.

Awards
In the Looking Glass was nominated for the "Most Original Programme/Series" BAFTA award for 1978 (the award was won by Pennies from Heaven).

Episode list
Broadcast dates:
Deserts (17 January 1978)
Space (24 January 1978)
Fading Away (31 January 1978)
Atlantis (7 February 1978)
The Centre of the Earth (14 February 1978)
Monopoly (21 February 1978)

References

External links
 

BBC television comedy
1970s British comedy television series
1978 British television series debuts
1978 British television series endings